The U.S. state of Arizona has two official state songs, although neither is named as such.  The official State Anthem is "The Arizona March Song" and the Alternate State Anthem is titled "Arizona".

State Anthem

History
The lyrics of "The Arizona March Song" were written by Margaret Rowe Clifford in 1915.  The music was composed by Maurice Blumenthal.

Lyrics

Alternate State Anthem

History
The Alternate Anthem, "Arizona," is a Country and Western song, written and performed by Rex Allen and Rex Allen, Jr.  It was adopted in 1981.

Lyrics

Notes

References

External links
 50states.com page on Arizona anthem
Arizona Secretary of State website's page on both Anthems
 State Symbols USA
 classbrain.com
 page about the Alternate Anthem

Music of Arizona
Arizona
Symbols of Arizona
Songs about Arizona